The Corfu trilogy is the unofficial name for three autobiographical books by British naturalist Gerald Durrell, giving humorous, exaggerated and sometimes fictionalised stories of the years that he lived as a child with his siblings and widowed mother on the Greek island of Corfu between 1935 and 1939. It describes the life of the Durrell family in a humorous manner, and explores the fauna of the island. A television series based on the trilogy, The Durrells, aired for four series from 3 April 2016 to 12 May 2019.

The three books are: 
 My Family and Other Animals (1956); 
 Birds, Beasts, and Relatives (1969); and 
 The Garden of the Gods (American title: Fauna and Family) (1978).

References 

Gerald Durrell